Avilov (masculine) or Avilova (feminine) is a Russian surname. It derives from the old Russian male first name Vavila (Vavilo).

The following people share this surname:
Lydia Avilova (1864–1943), Russian Soviet writer and memoirist
Mikhail Avilov (1882–1954), Russian Soviet painter and art educator
Mykola Avilov (born 1948), Ukrainian Soviet decathlete
Pyotr Avilov (1910–2004), Soviet sports shooter
Valentin Avilov, recipient of the Order of Naval Merit, a state decoration of Russia
Viktor Avilov (1900–?), Russian Soviet diplomat
Vladimir Avilov, Estonian association football player; captain of FC Infonet
Yevgeny Avilov, mayor of the city of Tula, Russia

See also
Nikolai Glebov-Avilov (1887–1937), Russian Bolshevik and Soviet politician
Avilovo, several rural localities in Russia

References

Notes

Sources
Ю. А. Федосюк (Yu. A. Fedosyuk). "Русские фамилии: популярный этимологический словарь" (Russian Last Names: a Popular Etymological Dictionary). Москва, 2006. 



Russian-language surnames